The 1898 World Figure Skating Championship is an annual figure skating competition sanctioned by the International Skating Union in which figure skaters compete for the title of World Champion.

In 1898, the competition took place on February 15 in London, United Kingdom. It was won by Henning Grenander of Sweden. However, the second- and third-place contestants, Gustav Hügel and Gilbert Fuchs, who had won the championship in 1897 and 1896 respectively, filed a protest alleging biased refereeing: In their opinion, Judges Adams, Jenkin, and von Rosen strongly overestimated the Swede, and Hügel and Fuchs demanded that he should be deprived of his title. The organizers considered the protest, but rejected it as not substantiated. After this scandal, Grenander left figure skating and no longer performed at official competitions.

Results

Men

Judges:
 W. F. Adams 
 C. E. Bell 
 C. Fillunger 
 A. F. Jenkin 
 Clarence von Rosen 
 J. H. Thomson

Sources
 Result List provided by the ISU
 ALLGEMEINE SPORT-ZEITUNG. (27 February 1898. №196)

World Figure Skating Championships
World Figure Skating Championships, 1898
World Figure Skating Championships
International sports competitions in London
World Figure Skating Championships
International figure skating competitions hosted by the United Kingdom
World Figure Skating Championships